Khejra Ghat is a village in the Bhopal district of Madhya Pradesh, India. It is located in the Berasia tehsil.

It is located close to the Guna-Bhopal road, near Nazirabad and Khejra Kalyanpur.

Demographics 

According to the 2011 census of India, Khejra Ghat has 165 households. The effective literacy rate (i.e. the literacy rate of population excluding children aged 6 and below) is 57.36%.

References 

Villages in Berasia tehsil